Lac Ste. Anne-Parkland is a provincial electoral district in Alberta, Canada. The district is one of 87 districts mandated to return a single member (MLA) to the Legislative Assembly of Alberta using the first past the post method of voting. It was contested for the first time in the 2019 Alberta election.

Geography
The district is located northwest of Edmonton, containing all of Lac Ste. Anne County and part of Parkland County, taking its name from the two municipal districts. It also contains a portion of Sturgeon County. It includes the Treaty 6 reserves of the Alexander First Nation, the Alexis Nakota Sioux First Nation, and the Paul Band at Wabamun Lake. The main towns and villages are Onoway, Wabamun, Alberta Beach and Mayerthorpe.

History

The district was created in 2017 when the Electoral Boundaries Commission recommended joining most of Whitecourt-Ste. Anne with parts of Barrhead-Morinville-Westlock, Spruce Grove-St. Albert, and Stony Plain in an effort to remove one district from central-western Alberta.

Electoral results

References

Alberta provincial electoral districts